Stellaria palustris is a species of flowering plant belonging to the family Caryophyllaceae.

Its native range is Temperate Eurasia.

References

palustris